Jumaa Saeed (born 13 September 1992) is an Ivorian professional footballer who plays as a midfielder.

References

1992 births
Living people
Ivorian footballers
Ivorian expatriate footballers
Espérance Sportive de Tunis players
Al Ain FC players
Al-Nahda Club (Oman) players
Al Salmiya SC players
Kuwait SC players
Tunisian Ligue Professionnelle 1 players
UAE Pro League players
Oman Professional League players
Kuwait Premier League players
Association football forwards
Expatriate footballers in Tunisia
Expatriate footballers in the United Arab Emirates
Expatriate footballers in Oman
Expatriate footballers in Kuwait
Ivorian expatriate sportspeople in Tunisia
Ivorian expatriate sportspeople in the United Arab Emirates
Ivorian expatriate sportspeople in Oman
Ivorian expatriate sportspeople in Kuwait
Footballers from Abidjan
Ivory Coast international footballers